Louis Marandi is an Indian politician and belongs to Bharatiya Janata Party. She was a cabinet minister in the Government of Jharkhand with portfolio like Welfare including Minority Welfare, Social Welfare, Women and Child Development.

She is the only popular women leader from the Jharkhand Bharatiya Janata Party organization. She had taken various important roles for Jharkhand Bharatiya Janata Party. As President of Women wing of Jharkhand Bharatiya Janata Party earlier, she was also member of Jharkhand Women's Commission.

She has lectured at various colleges of Jharkhand in Santali subject. She was Bharatiya Janata Party candidate from Dumka assembly in 2009 assembly election of Jharkhand. She was defeated by Chief Minister of Jharkhand and Jharkhand Mukti Morcha Supremo Shibu Soren's son Hemant Soren by about 3000 votes.

One of the biggest roles she played was as National Secretary of BJP in the year 2012 in the team of Rajnath Singh. In the parliamentary election of June 2014, she played a vital role to win 12 seats from Jharkhand out of 14, though she couldn't manage her ticket from Dumka seat in that election due to internal politics of BJP.

In 2014 Jharkhand Legislative Assembly election, she defeated Chief Minister of Jharkhand and Jharkhand Mukti Morcha Supremo Shibu Soren's son Hemant Soren by 5262 votes and became one of powerful leaders of Jharkhand politics. Now she is a cabinet minister of BJP led Jharkhand government. She represents Santal Pargans in Jharkhand government.

References

Living people
Jharkhand MLAs 2014–2019
People from Dumka district
Ranchi University alumni
Women in Jharkhand politics
State cabinet ministers of Jharkhand
1965 births
Bharatiya Janata Party politicians from Jharkhand
21st-century Indian women politicians
21st-century Indian politicians
Women state cabinet ministers of India